Biebrza is a river in northeastern Poland, a tributary of the Narew river (near Wizna), with a length of  and a basin area of 7,092 km2 (7,067 in Poland).

Larger towns in the area:
 Lipsk
 Sztabin
 Goniądz
 Osowiec-Twierdza
 Radzilow
 Wizna

The region is usually divided into lower, central, and upper basin areas, each with its own different characteristics.

Tributaries

 Right tributaries: Netta, Lega, Ełk, Wissa
 Left tributaries: Sidra, Brzozówka

Natural environment

Today, the river is best known for the vivid wildlife in the peatbogs and marshes in its flooding areas.

History

Historically, the borderland regions of Masovia and Lithuania, the area retains much of its cultural diversity today.

Cultural and linguistic environment

The basin of Biebrza river is inhabited not only by hundreds of rare and endangered sorts of birds, but also by people representing diverse cultures, languages and religions. While most of the population of the region speaks standard Polish, some people in the upper river basin (municipalities of Lipsk, Dąbrowa Białostocka and partly Sztabin) speak a local dialect of Belarusian (called by them prosty jazyk - "the simple language"). The people there belong to the Orthodox or Roman Catholic church. On the north bank of the upper Biebrza there are also a few villages where so called "old believers" live, who speak an archaic dialect of Russian. Some of these communities preserved much of their traditional culture in spite of a long lasting communist government policies aimed at assimilation of non-Polish cultural and linguistic minorities.

See also
 Biebrza National Park
 Augustów Canal
 Rivers of Poland

References

External links 
 Natural tourism (birdwatching) in Biebrza National Park
  Radzilow - Town running along the Biebrza

Rivers of Poland
Rivers of Podlaskie Voivodeship